Beli breg is a village in Serbia, in the municipality of Aleksinac in Nisava district. According to the census of 2002, there were 269 people (according to the census of 1991, there were 375 inhabitants).

Demographics
The village of Beli Breg has 242 adult inhabitants and the average age is 52.5 years (50.8 for men and 54.3 for women). It has 101 households and the average number of occupants per household is 2.66.
This village is largely populated by Serbs (according to the census of 2002) and in the last three censuses there was a decline in population.

References

Populated places in Nišava District